Julia Chambers is an English television actress. She was born in Bristol, England.

Selected filmography
Television
 The Mallens (1979)
 Cribb (1980)
 Shoestring (1980)
 Sense and Sensibility (1981)
 Beau Geste (1982)
 The Optimist (1985)
 Agatha Christie's Poirot (1989)
 Wycliffe (1995)

References

External links
 

1956 births
English television actresses
Living people